Oktyabrsky is a rural locality (a settlement) and the administrative center of Oktyabrsky Selsoviet, Kulundinsky District, Altai Krai, Russia. The population was 1,263 as of 2013. There are 15 streets.

Geography 
Oktyabrsky is located 5 km west of Kulunda (the district's administrative centre) by road. Kulunda is the nearest rural locality.

References 

Rural localities in Kulundinsky District